Hostel is 2013 teenage Nepali film directed by Hem Raj BC and Samosa Chat and produced by Sunil Rawal under Durgish Films. The film launched second generation faces in the film industry including Manish Magar, Asuka Magar and Ryousika Magar. The film is about the struggling life of Manish Magar in hostel.

Cast
 Anmol K.C. as Aditya Bikram Rana
 Prakreeti Shrestha as Shristy
 Gaurav Pahadi as Shree
 Salon Basnet as Hari Jung Shahi 'Junge'
 Rista Basnet as Erica
 Sunil Rawal as Warden

Critical response

After the successful screening of Saayad, Sunil Rawal was all set to give another hit in the box office. He launched new faces through this film, who were highly appreciated among public.

On successful screening of hostel crew members of hostel celebrated Success party on celebration of its 51-day on theater. Many faces of media personalities were seen in the party.

Accolades

Soundtrack

References

See also
 Anmol K.C.
 Prakreeti Shrestha
 Hostel returns
 Saayad

Films shot in Kathmandu
Nepalese coming-of-age films
2010s Nepali-language films